Margaret Harding (born 22 February 1948) is a Puerto Rican former swimmer. She competed in five events at the 1964 Summer Olympics.

References

1948 births
Living people
Puerto Rican female swimmers
Olympic swimmers of Puerto Rico
Swimmers at the 1964 Summer Olympics
Place of birth missing (living people)
Central American and Caribbean Games gold medalists for Puerto Rico
Central American and Caribbean Games medalists in swimming
Competitors at the 1966 Central American and Caribbean Games